Jay Gibbons (March 25, 1833, Westerlo, New York – 1897, Greene County, New York) was an American politician from New York.

Life
He was the son of Alfred Gibbons and Dorcas (Sweet) Gibbons. On June 10, 1856, he married Emily Lockwood (1834–1912).

He was a member of the New York State Assembly (Albany Co., 1st D.) in 1861. Gibbons was arrested on February 17, 1861 on charges of bribery. He was expelled from the Assembly On April 3, 1861, for attempting to acquire bribes in order to vote for certain legislation.

See also
List of New York Legislature members expelled or censured

References

 Biographical Sketches of the State Officers and Members of the State Legislature of New York by William D. Murphy (1861; pg. 202f)
In the Matter of the Breach of Privilege of Jay Gibbons from A Compilation of Cases of Breaches of Privilege of the House, in the Assembly of the State of New York (1871; pg. 115–120)

Further reading

1833 births
1897 deaths
Members of the New York State Assembly
Expelled members of the New York State Assembly
People from Westerlo, New York
19th-century American politicians